KAGF-LP (105.5 FM) is a radio station broadcasting a religious broadcasting format. Licensed to Twin Falls, Idaho, United States, the station serves the Twin Falls area. The station is currently owned by Amazing Grace Fellowship.

See also
List of radio stations in Idaho

References

External links
 

AGF-LP
AGF-LP
Radio stations established in 2005
2005 establishments in Idaho